Eduard Pagáč (born 1 May 1978) is a former football player from Slovakia and currently manager of ŠKF Sereď .

Career
At the age of 16, he had to stop his career due to health problems. In summer 2013, he was appointed as a head coach of the first team of FK Senica.

External links
 FK Senica profile

References

1978 births
Living people
Slovak footballers
Slovak football managers
FK Senica managers

Association footballers not categorized by position